Tankie is a pejorative label for leftists, particularly Stalinists, who support the authoritarian tendencies of Marxism–Leninism or, more generally, authoritarian states associated with Marxism–Leninism in history. The term was originally used by dissident Marxist–Leninists to describe members of the Communist Party of Great Britain (CPGB) who followed the party line of the Communist Party of the Soviet Union (CPSU). Specifically, it was used to distinguish party members who spoke out in defense of the Soviet use of tanks to violently crush the Hungarian Revolution of 1956 and the 1968 Prague Spring uprising, or who more broadly adhered to pro-Soviet positions.

The term is also used to describe people who endorse, defend, or deny the mistakes and crimes committed by Communist state leaders, such as Joseph Stalin, Mao Zedong, Pol Pot, and Kim il-Sung. Anti-Stalinist members of the left use the word to describe those who are perceived to have a bias in favor of authoritarian socialist states, such as the People's Republic of China, the Syrian Arab Republic, and the Democratic People's Republic of Korea.

Definition 

After the Prague Spring, the term was used to describe Communist party members who had supported the crushing of it by force of arms. According to Christina Petterson, "Politically speaking, tankies regard past and current socialist systems as legitimate attempts at creating communism, and thus have not distanced themselves from Stalin, China, etc." It was also used in the 1980s to describe the uncritical support the Morning Star gave to the Soviet intervention in Afghanistan. By 2017, tankie had re-emerged as internet slang for Stalinists, used by other Marxists, and it became particularly popular among young democratic socialists. Modern tankies generally do not get along with non-Marxist–Leninist segments of the left and many of those who oppose tankies also consider themselves leftists.

Especially in context of the 2022 Russian invasion of Ukraine, the term has also been used, such as by Sarah Jones of New York, for "elements within the self-identified [American] left that have soft-pedaled Russia's aggressive foreign policy and history of human rights abuses", with The Intercept journalist Roane Carey identifying the "key element in the tankie mindset [as] the simple-minded assumption that only the U.S. can be imperialist, and thus any country that opposes the U.S. must be supported."

Usage 
Tankie has its origins in British political rhetoric. It has since become a popular pejorative in English-language social media. In 2017, left-wing writer Carl Beijer argued that there are two distinct uses of the term tankie. The original, which was "exemplified in the sending of tanks into Hungary to crush resistance to Soviet communism. More generally, a tankie is someone who tends to support militant opposition to capitalism", and a more modern online variation, which means "something like 'a self-proclaimed communist who indulges in conspiracy theories and whose rhetoric is largely performative. He was critical of both uses.

An instance of the modern usage is the description of those "who instinctively defend China based on the idea that it is an example of actually existing socialism resisting Western imperialism", in discussions around the Uyghur genocide, where in this defence they will use neoconservative analysis to justify the anti-terrorism operations of the Chinese government. The term "Tankie" has also been used in contemporary times to describe the defenders of dictators like Bashar al-Assad or those who propogate pro-Russian narratives in the context of Putin's 2022 invasion of Ukraine.

In the United Kingdom 
Tankie originated as a term for British hardline members of the Communist Party of Great Britain (CPGB). The tankie wing of the CPGB was also sometimes called "Stalinist" and was associated with the views of the strong CPGB presence in trade unions in the United Kingdom. Journalist Peter Paterson asked the Amalgamated Engineering Union official Reg Birch about his election to the CPGB Executive after the Hungarian invasion in 1956. He recalled:

The support of the invasion of Hungary was disastrous for the party's reputation in Britain. The CPGB made mild criticisms of Soviet invasion of Czechoslovakia in 1968, which they called an intervention, although a hardline faction supported it, including the Appeal Group who left the party in response.

The term continued to be used into the 1980s, especially in relation to the split between the reform-minded Eurocommunist wing of the CPGB and the traditionalist, pro-Soviet group, the latter continuing to be labelled tankies. In the 2006 play Rock 'n' Roll by the Anglo-Czech author Tom Stoppard, the character Max, based on Eric Hobsbawm, discusses with Stephen what to read to hear what is happening in the Communist party, after the fall of the Berlin Wall. Their options are Marxism Today and the daily newspaper, the Morning Star.

The term is sometimes used within the Labour Party as slang for a politically old-fashioned leftist. Alastair Campbell reported a conversation about modernising education, in which Tony Blair said: "I'm with George Walden on selection." Campbell recalled: "DM [David Miliband] looked aghast... [Blair] said when it came to education, DM and I were just a couple of old tankies." In 2015, Boris Johnson referred to Jeremy Corbyn and the left wing of the Labour Party as "tankies and trots", the latter referring to Trotskyism.

Elsewhere 
The term tankie has been used in English-language social media to describe communists, particularly those from the Western world who uphold the legacies of Communist state leaders, such as Joseph Stalin and Mao Zedong. While generally used pejoratively, some Marxist–Leninists have reappropriated it and used the term as a badge of honor.

The Taiwanese left-wing magazine New Bloom alleges that many modern tankies are members of the Asian diasporas of English-speaking countries. In particular, members of the Chinese diaspora searching for radical responses to social ills such as xenophobia against Asians are drawn to tankie discourse. This modern conception of tankie has also been described as "diasporic Chinese nationalism".

In 2022, New York magazine observed that in the US "[s]o-called tankies don't make up the majority of Democratic Socialists of America (DSA) membership or wield much power within the broader left, but they do exist", and that "[l]eftists from other countries have been contending with the American tankie for years", quoting activists from Hong Kong and Poland.

See also 
 50 Cent Party
 Brezhnev Doctrine
 Chinese nationalism
 Little Pink
 Red fascism
 Regressive left
 Taistoism
 Tank Man
 The Stalinist Legacy
 Vatnik (slang)

Explanatory notes

References

General and cited references 
 

Anti-Stalinist left
Communism
Communist Party of Great Britain
Marxism
Political slurs for people
Socialism
Stalinism